Loganathan Srinivasan is an Indian cinematographer who predominantly works in Malayalam, Telugu, Tamil and Kannada film industries.

Career
Beginning his career in Telugu films, Loganathan shot for two films featuring Allari Naresh, before moving to work more in the Malayalam film industry. He shot for films including Moonnamathoral (2006), Annan Thambi (2008) and Major Ravi's war film, Kurukshetra (2008), before winning acclaim for his work in Ustad Hotel (2012).

He has recently began to work in Tamil films beginning with Yash Raj Films' Aaha Kalyanam (2014), after which he shot for Thirumanam Ennum Nikkah (2014) and Vaaliba Raja (2015).

Filmography

As cinematographer

References

External links
 

Living people
Tamil film cinematographers
Artists from Chennai
Cinematographers from Tamil Nadu
Malayalam film cinematographers
Year of birth missing (living people)